No Limits may refer to:

Books
No Limits: The Will to Succeed, a 2008 biography of Michael Phelps

Film, television, and video games
Need for Speed: No Limits, a 2015 mobile racing game in the Need for Speed franchise
No Limits (Australian TV series)
No Limits (Singaporean TV series), a 2010 Singaporean Chinese-language drama series
No Limits (British TV series), a 1985–1987 British television programme that aired on BBC Two
NoLimits, a software package for roller coaster simulation
No Limits (FIRST), 2004-05 FIRST Lego League game

Music
 No Limits (2 Unlimited album), 1993
 No Limits (Labyrinth album), 1996
 No Limits (Jay Perez album), 1996
 No Limits (U.D.O. album), 1998
 No Limits (Reset album), 1999
 No Limits (Martha Munizzi album), 2006
 No Limits (EP), a 2014 EP by Boyce Avenue
 "Interlude: No Limits", a track by Solange from the 2016 album A Seat at the Table

See also 
No Limit (disambiguation)